James Dahlberg is an emeritus professor of biomolecular chemistry at the University of Wisconsin–Madison. His research focuses on the biology of RNA. He was elected to the United States National Academy of Sciences in 1996.

Education
Dahlberg earned his bachelor's degree from Haverford College in 1962 and his Ph.D. from the University of Chicago in 1966. He completed his postdoctoral training at the MRC Laboratory of Molecular Biology in Cambridge with Frederick Sanger from 1966 to 1968 followed by additional work at the University of Geneva from 1968 to 1969.

Career
Dahlberg joined the faculty at the University of Wisconsin Department of Physiological Chemistry, which eventually became the Department of Biomolecular Chemistry, in 1969. He was promoted to full professor in 1974. He retired from the university in 2005, but still manages a small lab. He and colleague Lloyd smith formed Third Wave Technologies, a company that produced a technology to detect genetic variations. He was on the board of the Morgridge Institute for Research from 2009 to 2014 and served briefly as interim CEO.

Honors and awards
1974 – Eli Lilly Award in Biological Chemistry
1996 – Elected to the National Academy of Sciences

References

External links
Oral History from Cold Spring Harbor Laboratory

21st-century American chemists
Haverford College alumni
University of Chicago alumni
Living people
Members of the United States National Academy of Sciences
University of Wisconsin–Madison faculty
Year of birth missing (living people)